Stanchinsky is a Russian surname. Notable bearers of the surname include:

Alexei Stanchinsky (1888–1914), a Russian composer
Vladimir Stanchinsky (1882–1942), a Russian ecologist